The Samoa national rugby league team represents Samoa in rugby league football and has participated in international competition since 1986. Known as Western Samoa before 1997, the team is administered by Rugby League Samoa and are nicknamed Toa Samoa (English: Samoan Warriors).

Current roster
The Samoa national team for the 2021 Rugby League World Cup.

History
Western Samoa has participated in the Pacific Cup (1986–), World Sevens (1994, 1995, 2003), Super League World Nines (1996, 1997), World Cup (since 1995) and Pacific Rim (2004) competitions.

Early years

Western Samoa made their debut in the 1986 Pacific Cup. Joe Raymond coached this side to a final where they went down to a strong NZ Maori side. Joe Raymond went on to coach them again in 1988 and would return again to coach them 10 years later in 1998 in a one-off game against a Samoan team of Samoan resident players at Carlaw park.

William John "Swanny" Stowers and his wife Lyndsay Stowers operated Samoa Rugby League out of their North Shore home in Auckland and from the Richmond Rugby League Club house where Lyndsay ran the canteen. This resilient couple were known to have put a mortgage on their home to assist with funding the thirty (30) men representing Samoa in the Pacific Cup held in Tonga, 1990. This commitment lead to a historical win over the Maori team for the first time and a win in the 1990 Pacific Cup. Coached by the Richmond Bulldogs Head Coach, Steve Aigai.

Samoa then won the 1992 Pacific Cup over Tonga in an action filled thriller that went into two (2) overtimes and sent the NZ Rugby League and Polynesian rugby league public into a frenzy. The 1992 Tournament showcased all of NZ Rugby league talent and Australian Rugby league scouts were already booked to witness the 1994 Pacific Cup held in Fiji.

In 1993 Western Samoa were invited to the International Coca-Cola Sevens in Sydney. With Auckland based Samoan players such as Mark Elia, Tony Tuimavave, Tony Tatupu, Faausu Afoa and Des Maea followed by a group of up and coming players such as Matthew FuaSamoa, Lionel Perera, Aleki Maea, Paki Tuimavave, Joe Vagana, Sefo Fuimaono and Peter Lima, the team beat the Canberra Raiders and the Great Britain International team. Coached by the Richmond Bulldogs' Head Coach Steve Aigai, this team gave Samoa the status to create the strong foundation Western Samoa Rugby League needed to move forward. Below this strong foundation however was the strength and commitment of two people: Swanny and Lyndsay Stowers. These two held together the concept of Samoa Rugby League and without their dream, Samoa RL will not be where it is today.

Steve Aigai in his sixth year as the Samoan Coach had an array of NZ based quality players for the 1994 Pacific Cup with the likes of Se'e Solomona, Tony Tatupu, the Tuimavave brothers Paki and Tony plus the loyal players of Mike Setefano, Matthew FuaSamoa, Alex Tupou and Mark Faumuina. Henry Suluvale and Rudy David led the contingent of first class players from Canterbury however this arsenal were well contained by the Tongan stars Jim Dymock, John Hopoate, Solomon Haumono and Albert Fulivai.

Late 1990s
The 1995 Samoan team had the benefit of ex-All Blacks John Schuster and Va'aiga Tuigamala in their backline. When rugby union went openly professional players such as Apollo Perelini and Fereti Tuilagi left rugby league to return to the 15-man game.

Samoa lost the Pacific Cup in 1996.

The 1998 Pacific Cup team saw a new and old talent. Joe Raymond, one of the first Samoan Rugby League Rep coaches returned after coaching Tonga and the NZ Maori, the late Eddie Poching managed the team and the introduction of Francis Meli to Samoan Rugby League and Junior Papalii a loyal American Samoan Representative. Pati Tuimavave from the 1992 squad and Matthew TuiSamoa, the only survivor from 1990 Pacific Cup champion team returned. Samoa battled Tonga for the 1998 Pacific Cup again at Carlaw park and again Samoa regained the Pacific Champions Title.

2000s
The Pacific Cup was taken to Australia's Gold Coast in 2000 where Auckland coach John Ackland took over the reins. Ackland added another dimension to Samoa Rugby League in selecting rising stars Itikeri Samani a Canberra and Goulburn Stockmen Junior who previously represented American Samoa and Wayne McDade from the New Zealand Warriors while bringing back Matthew FuaSamoa into the Pacific Cup arena.

2000 Rugby League World Cup campaign

Samoa took on Ireland, Scotland, and the Aotearoa Māori in the 2000 Rugby League World Cup pool stages. They would lose to 'the Irish' in their opening game, but they'd beat NZ Maori, and Scotland in their next two games, sealing a place in the knock-out stages. They would take on Australia in the quarter-final. Unfortunately, they ended their tournament with a thrashing 66–10 defeat (their biggest defeat up to date), sealing an end to a respectable World Cup Campaign.

2008 Rugby League World Cup campaign

Samoa played in the Pacific Pool of the 2008 Rugby League World Cup Qualifiers.  They beat the Cook Islands and Fiji, but lost to Tonga. On a points difference, Samoa came in third and had to play USA in the Repecharge Semi Final. Samoa won this match 42–10 and then played Lebanon on 14 November 2007 in the Repecharge Final to see who would take the 10th and final World Cup place. Samoa came out eventual winners of the 10th and final 2008 Rugby League World Cup place beating Lebanon 38–16 at the Chris Moyles Stadium, Featherstone.

For the 2008 Rugby League World Cup tournament Samoa's main jersey sponsor was the Samoa International Finance Authority.

Samoa took on Tonga and Ireland in the Tournament's pool stages. They beat their Pacific rivals 20–12, but they then lost to the Irish by 34–16. This big losing margin, sent the Samoans into battle against the French in the Tournament's 9th place play-off. Samoa easily won, winning 42–10 and capping off an undesirable World Cup Tournament.

2013 Pacific Rugby League Test

In April 2013, Samoa took on Tonga in the '2013 Pacific Rugby League Test' at Penrith Stadium. The International was created as a World Cup warm-up match. Tonga targeted Samoa's weak defence, and it paid off, thrashing the Toa Samoans by 36–4.

Matt Parish era (2013– Present )
Australian Matt Parish was appointed head coach ahead of the 2013 World Cup. In the group stage, Samoa lost to  42–24, and defeated  38–4 and  22–6. They lost the quarter-final to  22–4.

In May 2014, Samoa defeated  32–16 in a one-off Test match to qualify for the 2014 Four Nations. In the Four Nations, Samoa was the fourth nation and the underdogs against rugby league's three big heavyweight nations England, New Zealand and Australia. But they proved that they were anything but underdogs, losing to England by six points in a sea-sawing battle, and they were within four minutes of creating rugby league history by beating New Zealand. By the final round, Samoa still had a chance to qualify for the final, making this Four Nations the toughest ever. This Samoan performance added credential to the rugby league game showing that the game is not all about the big three. An annual series against  was proposed to run likewise to Australia's State of Origin series.

In May 2015, Samoa took on Tonga. The game was an absolute thriller with the lead alternating between the teams and the biggest margin throughout the match was only 6 points. Samoa won 18–16. The following year, in May 2016, Samoa defeated Tonga 18–12.

However, due to the tournament structure, they advanced to the knock-out stage thanks to the draw. In the quarter-final, Samoa lost 46–0 to defending champions . Former rugby league players Reni Maitua and Willie Mason were heavily critical of the team after the tournament, claiming the players were staying up late at night and had no respect for coach Matt Parish.

In February 2021, it was reported that 34 current and former Samoan players had co-signed a letter to Samoan Prime Minister Tuilaepa Aiono Sailele Malielegaoi requesting for Parish to be removed as coach, citing a lack of professionalism and success. Parish responded by claiming the players were coerced to sign the letter. In May 2021, Andrew Johns, Matthew Johns and Sonny Bill Williams voiced interest to jointly coach Samoa at the 2021 World Cup. Rugby League Samoa affirmed Parish would remain as head coach for the tournament in a statement. NRL.com noted that Samoa has approximately 85 NRL players to choose from in 2021, more than is available for the successful n (60) and an (40) teams, however, according to reports, there are some players not willing to represent Samoa under the current coaching set-up.

In October 2022, Samoa opened the 2021 Men's Rugby League World Cup against host nation England. Despite high expectations for Samoa, due to high profile players such as Penrith Panthers premiership winning trio Jarome Luai, Brian To'o, and Stephen Crichton pledging allegiance to Samoa over Australia, Samoa went on to lose the match in embarrassing fashion, 60-6.

Samoa rebounded from the loss in the competition opener with big wins over Greece and France, 72-4 and 62-4 respectively.

Samoa qualified for the finals, coming second place in their pool behind England, and went on to face rivals Mate Ma'a Tonga in the quarter finals. Samoa would go on to win the match despite a late resurgence from Tonga to win 20-18, qualifying for their first ever world cup semi final.

Samoa would face England in the semi final, who they lost their first match against. In a back and forth encounter, the scores were tied at 20-20 with less than 8 minutes to go in the match but Stephen Crichton would intercept a pass from Victor Radley running more than 60 metres to score a try to put Samoa ahead. Several minutes later, with just 3 minutes left in the match, England halfback George Williams broke Samoas defence and passed to Herbie Farnworth who would complete a 90 metre long try, taking the score to 26-24. Tommy Makinson would then kick the conversion to tie the match. With the scores tied at 26-26, the match went to Golden Point, with England receiving the ball first. Jack Welsby made an error giving Samoa the ball, which would lead to an Anthony Milford field goal attempt but missed. England received the ball again but a Sam Tomkins error would give the ball back to Samoa once again and Stephen Chrichton kicked the field goal to win the match, 27-26. Sending Samoa to their first ever World Cup final against  Australia, and just the fifth team to qualify for the final. (Great Britain, England, France, New Zealand)

Competitive Record

All-time record

Below is the head-to-head record for the Samoa as of 24 December 2020.

World Cup

Four Nations

Pacific Cup

Notable players and coaches

 John Ackland (World Cup 2008 Coach)
 Steve Aigai Coach 1990–1994
 Steve Aigai 1986
 Afi Ah Kuoi 1986
 Andrew Ah Kuoi 1986
 George Apelu 1986
 Fa'ausu Afoa circa-1995
 Wing Afoa 1990–1994
 Isaak Ah Mau circa-2006
 Leeson Ah Mau 2013-17
 Roy Asotasi circa-2013
 Monty Betham circa-2000
 George Carmont circa-2008
 Victors Charles Charlie circa-2008
 Mark Elia circa-1995
 Henry Fa'afili circa-2000
 David Faiumu circa-2008
 Max Fala circa-2000
 Maika Felise circa-2000
 Beau Gallagher circa-2000
 Joe Galuvao circa-2000
 Simon Geros circa-2000
 Harrison Hansen circa-2008
 Sam Kasiano circa-2015
 Lolani Koko circa-1995
 Vae Kololo circa-2000
 Shane Laloata circa-2000
 Ali Lauiti'iti circa-2008
 Brian Laumatia circa-1995
 Mark Leafa circa-2000
 Brian Leauma circa-2000
 Tuaalagi Lepupa circa-2008
 Kylie Leuluai circa-2008
 Danny Lima circa-2006
 Jeff Lima circa-2006
 Jamahl Lolesi circa-2000
 Graham Lowe (World Cup 1995 coach)
 Chan Ly circa-2006
 Des Maea circa-1995
 Hutch Maiava circa-2006
 Gus Maietoa-Brown circa-1995
 Vila Matautia circa-1995
 Rusty Matua 1990
 Chris Magele 1998–2000
 Wayne McDade circa-2008
 Robert Moimoi 1986
 Francis Meli circa-2000/2008
 Laloa Milford circa-2000
 Paul Okesene 1986
 Lafu Papalii 1986–1990
 Junior Purcell 1998
 Sam Panapa circa-1995
 Matt Parish (World Cup 2013 coach) & (World Cup 2017 coach) & (World Cup 2021/22 coach)
 Joseph Paulo circa-2008
 Apollo Perelini circa-1995
 Fred Petersen circa-2000
 Robert Piva circa-1995
 Willie Poching circa-1995/2000 (World Cup 2000 Captain)
 Steve Price Coach 2010–2013
 Frank Pritchard circa-2014/2017 (World Cup 2017 Captain)
 Frank Puletua circa-2000/2008
 Tony Puletua circa-2008/2013
 Ben Roberts circa-2008/2013/2014
 Tangi Ropati circa-2008
 Tea Ropati circa-1995 
 Smith Samau circa-2008
 Itikeri Samani circa-2008
 John Schuster circa-1995 (World Cup 1995 Captain)
 Mike Setefano circa-1995
 Dave Sefuufa 1986
 Lagi Setu circa-2008
 Jerry Seu Seu circa-2000
 Terrence Seu Seu circa-2008
 Iosia Soliola circa-2013 (World Cup 2013 Captain)
 David Solomona circa-2000/2008
 Malo Solomona circa-2006
 Se'e Solomona circa-1995
 Fou Solomona 1986
 Miguel Start circa-2006
 Shannon Stowers circa-2006
 Henry Suluvale circa-1995
 Anthony Swann circa-2000
 Willie Swann circa-1995/2000
 Keneti Taogaga 1986–1990
 Willie Talau circa-2008
 Albert "Alby" Talipeau circa-2000/2008
 Tony Tatupu circa-1995/2000
 McConkie Tauasa circa-2006
 Misi Taulapapa circa-2008
 Ben Te'o circa-2008
 Junior Tia-Kilifi circa-2006
 Alex Tupou 1990–1994
 Va'aiga Tuigamala circa-1995
 Paddy Tuimavave circa-1992
 Paki Tuimavave circa-1990s
 Tony Tuimavave 1990–1995
 Matthew TuiSamoa 1990–2000
 Tupu Ulufale circa-2008
 Matt Utai circa-2008
 Earl Va'a circa-1995
 Chris Vaefaga circa-2006
 Joe Vagana circa-1995
 Nigel Vagana circa-1995/2008 (World Cup 2008 Captain)
 Gray Viane circa-2006
 Darrell Williams (World Cup 2000 coach)
 Vincent Winterstein 1990–1994
 Frank Winterstein circa-2006
Joe Raymond Coach 1986 Pacific Cup & 1988

Kit
Samoa's kit consists of a blue jersey with usually a white V on the chest, paired with blue shorts and socks.

Kit suppliers
Since 2021, Samoa's kits are currently supplied by Classic Sportswear. Former suppliers were FI-TA (2013-2021), SAS (2006–2013), SportM (1995–2000), Zeus (1992–1995) and Adidas (1990–1992).

Sponsors
The current sponsors are Pacifcast.

Former sponsors were DB Bitter (1992–1996), Yazaki (Rugby League World Cup 2000), SIFA.WS (2008–2015), Investsamoa.ws, and Vailima.

See also

Rugby league in Samoa
Samoa national rugby league team results
Samoa women's national rugby league team

References

External links
 Official site of Rugby League Samoa

 
Men's sport in Samoa
National rugby league teams
Rugby league in Samoa
Rugby League Four Nations
Pacific Rugby League International